Anodyne Records was founded in 1997 in Kansas City by John Hulston, beginning with the live Making Love EP by Kansas City rock band Shiner.  Over the years, there were albums from Onward Crispin Glover, Dirtnap, Overstep, The Hearers, and Open Hand.

Starting in 2005, Anodyne Records began growing; signing bands such as The Architects, Roman Numerals, The Valley Arena & the legendary Meat Puppets. In 2008, Anodyne Records began working on new releases from Open Hand, The BellRays, Sirhan Sirhan and The Vox Jaguars.

Artists
 Meat Puppets
 Open Hand
 Dirtnap
 The Hearers
 Roman Numerals
 The String and Return
 Shiner
 Onward Crispin Glover
 The Vox Jaguars
 Architects
 Little Brazil

See also 
 List of record labels

References

American record labels